Keith Jones is a former professional rugby league footballer who played in the 1980s and 1990s. He played at club level for Stanley Rangers ARLFC, Castleford (Heritage № 642), and Doncaster.

References

External links
Statistics at thecastlefordtigers.co.uk
Stanley Rangers ARLFC - Roll of Honour

Living people
Castleford Tigers players
Doncaster R.L.F.C. players
English rugby league players
Place of birth missing (living people)
Year of birth missing (living people)